The Stibbert Museum is located on via Frederick Stibbert on the hill of Montughi in Florence, Italy. The museum contains over 36,000 artifacts, including a vast collection of armour from Eastern and Western civilizations.

History of the family and museum
The museum was founded by Frederick Stibbert (1838–1906). His father was English and his mother Italian; he received his education in England. The Stibbert family's extreme wealth came from Frederick's grandfather, Giles Stibbert, who was the commander in chief for the British East India Company in Bengal at the end of the 18th century and ruled as governor for many years. 

Frederick Stibbert inherited the entire estate from his grandfather and did not work for the rest of his life. Instead, he dedicated his life to collecting objects, antiques, and artifacts and turned his villa into a museum. When the size of the collections outgrew the villa, Stibbert hired architect Giuseppe Poggi, painter Gaetano Bianchi and sculptor Passaglia to add on rooms.  

In 1906, when Stibbert died, his collection was given to the city of Florence and was opened to the public. Stibbert and his family are buried at Cimitero Evangelico agli Allori, Florence.

The museum 
The villa, which was once Stibbert's home, has 57 rooms that exhibit all of his collections from around the world. Most of the walls are covered in leather and tapestries and the rooms are crowded with artifacts. Paintings are displayed throughout every room, including still lifes and portraits.  There is also valuable furniture, porcelains, Tuscan crucifixes, Etruscan artifacts, and an outfit worn by Napoleon I of France.

The museum contains a cafe and a bookstore.

Arms and armour 
The most extensive collection is around 16,000 pieces of European, Oriental, Islamic, Japanese arms and armour from the 15th century through the 19th century.  The cavalcade room is a grand hall filled with 14 16th century knights on horseback and 14 foot-soldiers dressed in armour and holding weapons. The collection of Samurai armour contains over 80 suits and hundreds of swords.

References

External links
Stibbert Museum Official Website

Art museums and galleries in Florence
Museums in Florence
Military and war museums in Italy